Tony Butler may refer to:

 Tony Butler (broadcaster) (born 1935), British sports broadcaster
 Tony Butler (musician) (born 1957), bassist for the Scottish new wave band Big Country
 Tony Butler (footballer) (born 1972), English footballer
 Tony Butler (rugby union) (born 2002), Irish rugby union player

See also
Anthony Butler (disambiguation)